Charlie 'Higgo' Higson-Smith is a Hong Kong rugby union player. He plays for the Hong Kong Football Club and the Hong Kong national rugby union team. Higson-Smith made his international debut for Hong Kong at the 2015 Asian Rugby Championship against South Korea.

Charlie is known by his close friends simply as “El Higgo” or “Gonzalo”. Other titles include: “quadzilla”, “Jesus christ” and “Charles on Toast”.

References

Living people
Hong Kong rugby union players
Hong Kong international rugby union players
Year of birth missing (living people)
Rugby union wings